David Steinmetz may refer to:

 David Steinmetz (historian) (1936–2015), American historian
 David Steinmetz (American football) (born 1995), American football offensive tackle